This is a list of the National Register of Historic Places listings in Ravalli County, Montana.

This is intended to be a complete list of the properties and districts on the National Register of Historic Places in Ravalli County, Montana, United States.  There are 91 properties and districts listed on the National Register in the county.

Current listings

|}

See also

 List of National Historic Landmarks in Montana
 National Register of Historic Places listings in Montana

References

Ravalli